Laurel is a district of the Corredores canton, in the Puntarenas province of Costa Rica.

History 
Laurel was created on 22 August 1995 by Ley 7539.

Geography 
Laurel has an area of  km² and an elevation of  metres.

Demographics 

For the 2011 census, Laurel had a population of  inhabitants.

Transportation

Road transportation 
The district is covered by the following road routes:
 National Route 238
 National Route 608
 National Route 611

References 

Districts of Puntarenas Province
Populated places in Puntarenas Province